Michael McGlynn (born 11 May 1964) is an Irish composer, producer, director, and founder of the vocal ensemble Anúna.

Career
McGlynn was born in Dublin and attended Coláiste na Rinne and Blackrock College. He was a student of Music and English at University College Dublin and Trinity College where he studied for an M.Litt degree. He obtained a Bachelor of Arts degree (1985) and Bachelor in music (1986) from University College Dublin. He was a member of the RTÉ Chamber Choir and in 1987 he founded the Irish choral group Anúna (originally spelt "An Uaíthne"). Anúna have released fourteen albums, almost exclusively featuring his arrangements and original works. Deep Dead Blue was nominated for a Classical Brit Award in 2000 and went Top 5 in the UK Classical Charts. Anúna: Celtic Origins was the biggest selling world music CD in the US in August 2007 according to Nielsen Soundscan , and remained in the top twenty albums of the Billboard World Music Charts until early 2008. Although best known as a writer of choral music, McGlynn has written orchestral and instrumental works as well as cantatas and masses. 2007 saw the premiere of the cantata St. Francis commissioned by RTÉ, the Irish National broadcasting station. It is a setting of texts associated with Francis of Assisi for tenor, choir and symphony orchestra. The album Behind the Closed Eye is a collaboration with the Ulster Orchestra, Northern Ireland's premiere orchestra.

McGlynn has written music for theatre, including the Adrian Noble/Cusack family production of Anton Chekhov's "Three Sisters" at the Gate Theatre, Dublin, and the Royal Court, London. He is also a vocal and choral clinician, working recently in the University of Miami (US), Sumida Hall (Japan) and Festival 500 in Newfoundland (Canada). He was an Eminent Scholar at Florida Atlantic University for the 2011–12 academic year. In 2017 he was awarded the University College Dublin Alumni Award for Arts and Humanities. McGlynn will be the Artistic Director of the 2021 Tampere Vocal Music Festival in Finland.

McGlynn's music has been recorded and performed by such internationally recognised performers and ensembles as Rajaton, Dawn Upshaw, the National Youth Choir of Great Britain, The Dale Warland Singers, the Phoenix Chorale [formerly the Phoenix Bach Choir], Conspirare, the BBC Singers and Chanticleer.

Musical language
McGlynn's harmonic language combines elements of traditional Irish music such as modal melodic lines and ornamentation, fixed and shifting drones and liberal use of jazz-tinged chordal clusters and sonorities. These features can be heard in his contribution to the Chanticleer-commissioned And on Earth Peace: A Chanticleer Mass. McGlynn contributed the 'Agnus Dei' to this multi-composer work. McGlynn says "One of the misapprehensions about my music is that I am not actually concerned with saving Irish traditional music; I am not a traditionalist. The only exposure I had [to traditional Irish song] was during my year at Coláiste na Rinne in Dún Garbhán. The songs that I set are not from a specific collection; they are more impressions of the songs I remembered."

McGlynn also created new compositions that could be perceived as arrangements of Irish songs but were, in fact, new melodies composed to traditional texts. He has stated that "People just assume that I have just found a 'living' version. In fact I have done what has made solo traditional music so viable: I have created a new version. I take the songs and reinterpret them in a new way. My priority is always to create a choral version that works." His most successful choral work in this genre is "Dúlamán", a setting of the traditional Irish poem of the same name. This work has been performed and recorded extensively by professional choral groups such as Chanticleer and Cantus. It features another characteristic aspect of his musical language in its use of multiple alternating rhythms.

Karen Marrolli for her 2010 thesis on McGlynn writes: "Throughout all of McGlynn's work, while there are a good amount of compositional thumbprints and overarching characteristics, there also is a great deal of variety. This is an incredibly refreshing aspect to McGlynn's choral writing. Various constant influences are present in his music and give his canon a sense of identity; however, he does not simply reconstruct successful pieces over and over again in an attempt to rest on his laurels. His body of work displays a great range of techniques and musical ideas and continues to develop and mature. Further study of some of his more recently recorded works, such as O Maria and the brilliant work Victimae (both released on the 2009 Anúna CD Sanctus) would reveal how his musical influences factor into his compositional efforts in ever-evolving ways. This continuous growth bodes well for the longevity of this composer as he takes his place among the important composers of our time.

Selected works
A selection of McGlynn's original works: 
 Invocation (Tenor & mixed-chorus)
 Four Tenebrae Responsories (Tenebrae I, II, III & IV. For mixed chorus)
 Sensation (Speaker, mixed chorus & concert harp)
 Celtic Mass (For mixed-chorus, solo vocalists, violin, organ, percussion & harp. Includes settings of "Kyrie", "Gloria" "Incantations", Responsorial "Codhlaím go Suan", "Credo", Pater Noster", Sanctus" "Agnus Dei", "Ave Maria")
 Silver River (Oboe & vibraphone. Also version for mixed chorus, clarinet and string orchestra)
 Four Poems on texts by Rimbaud (Soprano/Piano)
 Wind on Sea (Mixed Voice Choir & Violin)
 Quis est Deus (Mixed-voice choir)
 O Ignis Spiritus (Saxophone, mixed voice choir & mezzo-soprano solo)
 Agnus Dei (Tenor solo & mixed-voice choir, from "And on Earth Peace, a Chanticleer Mass")
 Behind the Closed Eye (Symphony orchestra and SATB Choir. This work includes works for choir, orchestra and both forces combined. Titles include "May", "Twilight", "The Coming of Winter", "August" "Midnight" "The Great Wood", "Annaghdown", "Behind the Closed Eye", "Ceann Dubh Dílis", "Aisling", "Where All Roses Go" & "1901")
 Visions (Three movements, for soprano saxophone & piano)
 O Maria (Mixed-voice choir)
 Brezairola (Tenor solo & mixed-voice choir)
 Dúlamán (Male voice choir)
 The Sea (Alto flute, flute and mixed-voice choir)
 Lux Aeterna / The Road of Passage (Soprano solo, mixed voice choir)
 The Rising of the Sun (Solo voice, mixed-voice choir & symphony orchestra)
 Geantraí (Mixed-voice choir)
 Pie Jesu (Symphony Orchestra & mixed-voice choir)
 Maid in the Moor (Women's chorus)
 Cúnnla (Women's chorus)
 Dormi Jesu (Mixed-voice choir)
 My Songs Shall Rise (Mixed-voice choir)
 When the War is Over (Mixed-voice choir)
 Victimae (Male-voice choir)
Takahime (Mixed Voices)
Why Should I Sleep? (Mixed Voices)
Sunshine & Shadows (Mixed Voices and Piano)
Amhrán na Gaoithe/Song of the Wind Mixed Voices)
O pia virgo (ATBarB)

Selected discography

Anúna releases
Anúna's CD and DVD release feature McGlynn's work almost exclusively. This is a selected list of their main releases :
 1993 – Anúna (re-recorded 2005)
 1994 – Invocation (re-recorded 2002)
 1995 – Omnis (Irish edition)+
 1996 – Omnis (entirely re-recorded international version of the 1995 release)+
 1996 – Deep Dead Blue (remastered 2004)
 1997 – Behind the Closed Eye (remastered 2003)
 2000 – Cynara
 2006 – Sensation
 2007 – Celtic Origins [CD and DVD]
 2008 – Christmas Memories [CD and DVD]
 2009 – Invocations of Ireland [DVD]
 2009 – Sanctus
 2010 – Christmas with Anúna
 2012 – Illumination
 2015 – Revelation
 2018 – Transcendence

+ Both albums amalgamated into a single remastered release in 2003.

Other releases
"And on Earth Peace: A Chanticleer Mass" Chanticleer (ensemble), featuring the Agnus Dei
"Wondrous Love" Chanticleer, featuring Dúlamán
"Out of Bounds" Rajaton, featuring The Wild Song
"Boundless" Rajaton, featuring Summer Song
"Silver River" Matthew Manning, includes Silver River, Aisling, Nightfall, Where All Roses Go
"Let Your Voice be Heard" Cantus (vocal ensemble), featuring Dúlamán
"Carmina Celtica" Canty, featuring Lorica
"Turn Darkness into Light" Consono, featuring Incantations
"Kantika Sakra" Kantika Korala, featuring Sanctus : Sanctua
"Aria", by Gerard McChrystal, featuring Aisling, Behind the Closed Eye and From Nowhere to Nowhere 
"The Siren's Call", by Chanticleer, featuring Amhrán na Gaoithe/Song of the Wind,  Hinbarra 
"Sing Thee Nowell", by New York Polyphony, featuring O pia virgo commissioned by the ensemble. Grammy nominated 2015 (Chamber Music Category). BIS Records
Celtic Mass, by The Taylor Festival Choir. Released 2016 on Delos Records.
Artifacts, by Kansas City Chorale, conductor Charles Bruffy. Released 2018 on 2Foals Records.
Where All Roses Go, by Apollo5 featuring the piece "Where All Roses Go". Released 2020 on VCM Records (Apollo5 Website).

Bibliography
 Axel Klein: Die Musik Irlands im 20. Jahrhundert (Hildesheim: Georg Olms, 1996); .
 Stacie Lee Rossow: The Choral Music of Irish Composer Michael McGlynn (DMA thesis, University of Miami, 2010).
 Karen Marrolli: "An Overview of the Choral Music of Michael McGlynn with a Conductor’s Preparatory Guide to His Celtic Mass" (DMA thesis, Louisiana State University, 2010).

References

External links
 Michael McGlynn's webpage
 Anúna's website

1964 births
20th-century classical composers
20th-century Irish people
21st-century classical composers
21st-century Irish people
Alumni of University College Dublin
Classical composers of church music
Irish classical composers
Irish-language singers
Irish male classical composers
Irish music arrangers
Living people
Musicians from Dublin (city)
People educated at Blackrock College
20th-century male musicians
21st-century male musicians